Mary Saxer (born June 21, 1987) is an American track and field athlete who competes in the pole vault.

She did not improve on this mark while competing collegiately for the University of Notre Dame, although she did win three Big East Conference titles and was third at the 2009 NCAA Women's Outdoor Track and Field Championship. She finally bettered her mark at the 2010 USA Outdoor Track and Field Championships, where she was third in her first national podium finish.

She was the 2012 national runner-up indoors and represented her country at the 2012 IAAF World Indoor Championships. Saxer won the 2014 USA Indoor title and made her second international appearance at the 2014 IAAF World Indoor Championships.

Biography

Early life and college
Born in Buffalo, New York to Ann and Don Saxer, she grew up in Lancaster, New York and attended Lancaster High School. Saxer was involved in gymnastics from a young age but gave up the sport around the age of twelve. She remained interested in sports, however, and became interested in track and field athletics, first sprint and then long jumping. She was a four-time state schools champion in the long jump. However, it was in the pole vault that she truly excelled in her youth. Rick Suhr, a New York-based vaulting coach, spotted Saxer at a long jump training camp in summer 2003 and encouraged her to try out the new event.

Working with Suhr and her high school coach, Kevin Carriero, Saxer swiftly established herself among the best young vaulters in the world. (Women's pole vault was still in an early stage as it only became an Olympic event in 2000.) The following year she cleared four metres for the first time and won at the National Scholastic Indoor Championships. She competed against fully fledged professionals at the Millrose Games soon after and managed sixth place. She was named 2005 National High School Indoor Athlete of the Year and also managed to gain two letters for the high school field hockey team at the same time. Her high school success came at the same time as her coach, Carriero, was undergoing treatment for cancer – a condition that went into remission in Saxer's last year for the school team.

Saxer gained an athletic scholarship to attend the University of Notre Dame in 2005 and chose to study marketing in the Mendoza College of Business. She was runner-up at the Big East Conference indoor championship and also managed ninth in the long jump. Outdoors she won at the Mt. SAC Relays and placed fourth in the Big East pole vault. Her performances stagnated in the 2007 season, as she failed to get over the four-meter mark that year. She repeated as the Big East runner-up indoors, but was out of the top three at the outdoor Big East meet. She won at the Mt. SAC Relays for a second time and claimed her first conference title at the Big East outdoor championship, where she was also in the top ten in long jump. Her best college performances came in the 2009 season. She also entered the 2009 USA Outdoor Track and Field Championships, but did not record a valid mark.

Professional
After graduating from Notre Dame in 2009, she began to compete nationally, training under her coach Danny Wilkerson. She competed abroad for the first time in 2011. Later that year she also won at the Spitzen Leichtathletik Luzern and was second at the Meeting Sport Solidarieta. She was sixth at the USA indoor championship and placed fifth at the USA Outdoors.

A runner-up finish at the 2012 USA indoors with a personal record of  brought her a place at the 2012 IAAF World Indoor Championships, her first international selection. At that competition she cleared the opening height of  but got no further. Saxer missed the opportunity to compete at the 2012 London Olympics when she finished fourth on count-back at the 2012 United States Olympic Trials behind Lacy Janson. She struggled on the international circuit that year, failing to record a height at two meets in Brazil and coming out of the top six at the Shanghai, Doha and Birmingham Diamond League events.

At the 2013 USA Outdoor Track and Field Championships she was again out of the medals, finishing in the fourth for the second year running. She competed on the European track circuit for the rest of the year, with a meeting record at the KBC Night of Athletics and a second place at the Palio Citta della Quercia meet being the highlights.

At the 2014 USA Outdoor Track and Field Championships
Saxer cleared  at 2016 USA Indoor Track and Field Championships to place 5th. Saxer made the final clearing  in 2016 United States Olympic Trials (track and field), but nh in the final.

Personal records
Outdoors
Pole vault –  (2013)
Long jump –  (2004)
Indoors
Pole vault –  (2014)
Long jump –  (2008)

Competition record

National titles
USA Indoor Track and Field Championships: 2014

References

External links
Official website

Living people
1987 births
American female pole vaulters
Notre Dame Fighting Irish women's track and field athletes
Track and field athletes from Buffalo, New York
People from Lancaster, New York
People from Boston
USA Indoor Track and Field Championships winners